The Äusser Rothorn is a mountain of the Swiss Pennine Alps, overlooking Saas-Balen in the canton of Valais. It lies at the western end of the Rothorngrat, descending from the Senggchuppa.

References

Mountains of the Alps
Alpine three-thousanders
Mountains of Valais
Mountains of Switzerland